Olle Tandberg (10 October 1918 – 26 December 1996) was a Swedish heavyweight boxer, and the European amateur boxing champion between 1937 and 1939.

Biography
Tandberg was born in Stockholm, Sweden on 10 October 1918. During his career he had 30 fights, winning 23 (11 by KO), losing 6 (1 by KO), and drawing 1. He fought in the 1936 Berlin Olympics where he defeated US boxer Art Oliver. He lost in the second round of competition to Hungarian Ferenc Nagy. On 14 August 1949 he lost to Jersey Joe Walcott on TKO in the 5th round. He died in Stockholm on 26 December 1996.

References

External links

1918 births
1996 deaths
Heavyweight boxers
Olympic boxers of Sweden
Boxers at the 1936 Summer Olympics
European Boxing Union champions
Swedish male boxers
Sportspeople from Stockholm
20th-century Swedish people
Djurgårdens IF boxers